The House of Angelo is a 1997 British historical drama film directed by Jim Goddard and starring Edward Woodward, Peter Woodward and Sylvia Syms.

Plot
In eighteenth century London, the celebrated Angelo family of fencing instructors are employed to protect a visiting Ambassador from French assassins.

Cast
 Edward Woodward - Dominic Angelo 
 Peter Woodward - Harry Angelo 
 Sylvia Syms - Alice Angelo 
 Isla Blair - Peg Wallington 
 Anthony Valentine - Lord Travers 
 Rudolph Walker - Somers 
 Julian Glover - Sir Robert Willoughby 
 Patrick Toomey - Mr. Clare 
 Sarah Preston - Meg 
 David Robb - Lord Vanbrugh 
 Joe Shaw - Octavius 
 Sarah Woodward - Elisabeth Angelo 
 Tim Woodward - William Angelo
 Blair Plant - Foster 
 Mark Delafield - Sir James 
 Anne-Marie Marriott - Maria 
Qarie Marshall - Swordsman
 Mark Byron - Swordsman

References

External links

1997 films
1997 drama films
Films directed by Jim Goddard
British drama films
1990s English-language films
1990s British films